King of Hearts is a studio album by American rapper and producer Camu Tao, who died of lung cancer in 2008. It was released posthumously via Fat Possum Records and Definitive Jux on August 17, 2010.

Critical reception
At Metacritic, which assigns a weighted average score out of 100 to reviews from mainstream critics, King of Hearts received an average score of 71% based on 6 reviews, indicating "generally favorable reviews".

Josh Langhoff of PopMatters gave the album 6 stars out of 10, describing it as "the sound of Camu [Tao] reaching out, trying to connect with people while grappling with the most personal elements of his life."

Camu Tao’s friend and fellow rapper Cage, began a close working relationship in 2010 with another Ohio native Kid Cudi. During that time he showed Cudi the demos for the posthumous Tao album, with Cage telling El-P (a mutual friend of Cage and Tao) that Cudi was “super into the record and really into Camu and felt really connected to the music.” El-P and Cage asked Cudi if he would give them a quote for the record: "These songs are so before their time it’s ridiculous. The melodies and harmonies are very clever, the lyrics are quick witted and his vocal arrangements are genius. People need to hear this shit and know this man’s story. Camu was a great future Ohio talent who I’m sure would have made a huge mark in this mediocre industry."  
– Kid Cudi

Track listing
All tracks written and produced by Camu Tao.

Charts

References

External links
 

2010 albums
Fat Possum Records albums
Definitive Jux albums
Albums published posthumously